Andrée Servilanges (1911–2001) was a French stage and film actress. She was married to the film director Paul Mesnier. In 1934 she starred in Robert Bresson's directorial debut, the short film Public Affairs.

Selected filmography
 Les affaires publiques (1934)
 The Scarlet Bazaar (1947)
 The Porter from Maxim's (1953)
 Tourments (1954)
 Babes a GoGo (1956)

References

Bibliography
 Pipolo, Tony. Robert Bresson: A Passion for Film. Oxford University Press, 2010.

External links

1911 births
2001 deaths
French film actresses
French stage actresses
Actresses from Paris
20th-century French actresses